Mercy Black is a 2019 American horror film written and directed by Owen Egerton.  It stars Daniella Pineda as a woman who is released from a psychiatric hospital 15 years after stabbing a classmate because of an urban legend about a ghost known as Mercy Black.  After her nephew Bryce (Miles Emmons) becomes obsessed with the same ghost, she comes to believe the ghost may be real. Austin Amelio and Janeane Garofalo appear in supporting roles. The film was released to Netflix on March 31, 2019, with no prior announcement.

Plot 
As a teenager, Marina Hess and Rebecca Cline stabbed a classmate because Marina believed a ghost called Mercy Black would cure her mother's illness. Fifteen years later, Marina is released from a psychiatric hospital to her sister, Alice. To Marina's dismay, urban legends about Mercy Black have spread on the internet. Alice's son, Bryce, soon becomes obsessed with Mercy Black. While facing her past to help Bryce avoid the same fate, Marina questions whether Mercy Black is merely a delusion of her own creation. When she goes to visit Rebecca to talk about what happened when they were children, she discovers that Rebecca attempted to hang herself and is now in a catatonic state. When looking around Rebecca's room, Marina discovers an old map and Rebecca attacks her.

Bryce is brought home by the librarian after tearing up library books. When he is involved in an incident with his "friend," he says "she told me to do it". Meanwhile, Marina follows the map through the woods, discovering old clues along the way that lead to a nuclear fallout shelter. Inside, she finds "the book you cannot read" and remembers that they created Mercy Black. While Marina now believes that Mercy never existed, Bryce falls deeper into the delusion. While alone in the house, Bryce and Alice have an encounter with Mercy Black, leading to Alice falling over the stair rail. After Marina arrives, Mercy Black attacks her. When Bryce flees out the door, he runs straight into the arms of the librarian, who turns out to be Lily Bellows, the girl Marina and Rebecca intended to sacrifice.

Lily is angry that she lived and Marina didn't finish her off as she promised. She admits to hurting people to make Marina remember but Marina tells her that they made Mercy up. Lily stabs Marina and threatens to slit Bryce's throat. Marina tackles and begins choking her but releases her. Bryce then stabs Lily in the eye and says "I made a promise" as Mercy Black appears behind him.

Cast 
 Daniella Pineda as Marina Hess
 Jamy Lentz as young Marina
 Austin Amelio as William Nylund
 Elle LaMont as Alice Hess
 Lee Eddy as Lily Bellows
 Elke Boucher-Depew as young Lily
 Miles Emmons as Bryce
 Janeane Garofalo as Dr. Ward
 Dylan Gage as Sam
 Rochelle Robinson as Mrs. Cline
 Jessie Tilton as Rebecca Cline
 Sophiánna Smith as young Rebecca

Production 
Writer-director Egerton said he began researching childhood crimes after the Slender Man stabbing.  One of the inspirations for the story was Mary Bell, who had murdered two toddlers when she was a child.  Bell had been granted a new identity after being released from jail, but tabloid reporters discovered her new identity.  Producers wanted the protagonist to be innocent, but Egerton told them that the story depended on facing one's past.

Release 
Mercy Black was released on Netflix with no advance notice on March 31, 2019.

Reception 
Based on four reviews, Metacritic rated it 48/100, which it labels "mixed or average reviews". Noel Murray of the Los Angeles Times compared it favorably to Slender Man, calling it "nerve-wracking throughout". Matthew Monagle of The Austin Chronicle rated it 2/5 stars and criticized the film for exploiting mental illness as a plot device instead of making intelligent observations. William Bibbiani of IGN rated it 5.5/10 and wrote that the film fails to live up to its disturbing premise because of the poor writing and direction.

It grossed $200,046 at the box office.

References

External links 
 

2019 films
2019 horror films
American horror films
American ghost films
Fiction about urban legends
Films about murder
2010s English-language films
2010s American films
Blumhouse Productions films